The Detroit Jazz Festival is a free jazz festival held every year during Labor Day Weekend at Hart Plaza and Campus Martius Park in Detroit, Michigan.

History
The festival began in 1980. Until 2000, it was known as the Montreux-Detroit Jazz Festival. The festival again changed names in 2005, becoming the Detroit International Jazz Festival after Ford Motor Company removed its sponsorship.

In January 2006 Gretchen Valade, Chairman of Mack Avenue Records founded the Detroit International Jazz Festival Foundation, which took over production and management of the festival. Since 2012 the festival has been called the Detroit Jazz Festival.

Performers have included Dave Brubeck, Gary Burton, Regina Carter, Chick Corea, Dave Holland, Joe Lovano, The Manhattan Transfer, Wynton Marsalis, Pat Metheny, Mulgrew Miller,  Paquito d'Rivera, Sonny Rollins, Wayne Shorter,  Take 6, and Tower of Power.

The 2020 festival will be going virtual, as concerts will be held behind closed doors caused by the COVID-19 pandemic.

See also

 Lansing JazzFest
 Music of Detroit

References

External links
 

Music festivals in Detroit
Jazz festivals in the United States
Summer festivals
Tourist attractions in Detroit
Music festivals established in 1980
1980 establishments in Michigan